Kuurne Heliport  is a heliport located near Kuurne, West Flanders, Belgium.

See also
List of airports in Belgium

References 

Airports in West Flanders